William D. Burns (born August 22, 1973 in Cleveland, Ohio) is an American politician and businessman, a former member of the Chicago City Council, representing Chicago's 4th ward, and the State House. A member of the Democratic Party, Burns represented the 26th District in the Illinois House of Representatives from 2008 through 2011. After winning election as an alderman on February 22, 2011, he resigned as a state legislator. In February 2016, Alderman Burns announced his resignation from the Chicago City Council to take a job with Airbnb.

Background
Burns was born in Cleveland, where he attended local schools. He relocated to Chicago to attend college and graduate school, studying at the University of Chicago, where he received both his B.A. and M.A. degrees.

Becoming involved in Democratic Party politics, Burns served as a former Deputy Chief of Staff and Senior Advisor to Emil Jones, the Illinois Senate President. Burns was Vice President of Program and Field Offices for the Chicago Urban League. Burns has also served as an Education and Tax Policy Manager for the Metropolitan Planning Council, a community outreach coordinator for State Senator Barack Obama, and the Deputy Campaign Manager for Obama for Congress 2000.

Illinois State Representative
In 2008 Burns challenged incumbent State Representative Elga Jeffries, and defeated her in the Democratic Primary on "Super Tuesday." He defeated perennial candidate Sylvester "Junebug" Hendricks in the general election. As a State Representative, Burns has served on committees addressing education, health care, and government reform. Burns also sponsored the first green jobs program in the United States which was specifically targeted to low-income urban areas. The Urban Weatherization Jobs Initiative employs inner-city residents in the weatherization of homes and other buildings on the South Side of Chicago. Burns also has supported  reform to Illinois' campaign finance laws, strengthening gun control, and reform to the property tax system.

Campaign for Alderman of Chicago's Fourth Ward
In November 2010, five-term Alderman Toni Preckwinkle was elected Cook County Board President. Community leader Shirley Newsome was appointed by Chicago Mayor Richard M. Daley to serve  the remainder of Preckwinkle's term, but did not seek a full term.

With Preckwinkle's support, Burns entered the race for Alderman in the February 22, 2011 first round of the municipal election, choosing against a temporary appointment for the remainder of Preckwinkle's term. Burns faced five Democratic or independent opponents, and Lori Yokoyama, who was endorsed by the Chicago GOP and Chicago Young Republicans. Burns won the race with 64.6% of the vote in the February 22nd election. Burns served as a delegate to the 2012 Democratic National Convention.

Aldermanic Committees

 Rules and Ethics
 Finance
 Housing and Real Estate
 Pedestrian and Traffic Safety
 Transportation and Public Way
 Workforce Development and Audit

Private Sector
While alderman, Burns moonlighted for a public affairs consulting firm founded by one of President Barack Obama's top advisers. Then in February 2016, Burns announced his departure from the Chicago City Council to take join Airbnb as "director, Midwest policy and senior adviser", starting March 1, 2016. However, after he left office, the Chicago Ethics Board had reason to believe that Burns violated a city prohibitions against lobbying the city for a full calendar year after leaving the City Council. The board published a settlement with Burns of a $5000 fine without an admission of wrongdoing in 2019. As a member of the City's Ethics Reform Task Force Burns had helped author the City’s ethics ordinance.

Family
Burns has one daughter, Athena.

Electoral history

Illinois House of Representatives - 26th District

Alderman, 4th Ward

References

External links

Illinois General Assembly - Representative William D. Burns (D) 26th District official IL House website
http://www.aldwillburns.com/index.asp - Official Aldermanic Website
Bills Committees
Project Vote Smart - Representative William D. Burns (IL) profile
Follow the Money - William D. Burns
2008 campaign contributions
Illinois House Democrats - William D. Burns profile

Democratic Party members of the Illinois House of Representatives
Living people
1973 births
Chicago City Council members